Kaki Leung (born 14 July 1981) is a Hong Kong television actress and hostess.

Education 
In 2003, Leung received a Bachelor of Acting degree with Honors from The Hong Kong Academy for Performing Arts (HKAPA).

Career 
Leung was an entertainment news hostess at i-Cable Television Service Ltd from 2003 to 2007. She served Television Broadcasts Limited from 2007 to 2020 and is currently developing her career as a hostess and an actress. 
She took the role of Fa Yeuk-Bo in Emergency Unit, a popular drama aired in 2009. Kaki has participated in more than 15 dramas in the past 5 years. She also performed in Sand and a Distant Star in the same year. In 2014, she starred in Swipe Tap Love as the character of Natasha. Seeing that Swipe Tap Love became a popular drama, Kaki's participation increased her popularity in Hong Kong. As a hostess, she has also hosted more than 10 programs including Sidewalk Scientist which has been nominated by TVB Awards Presentation 2013 as one of the Best Informative Program Series.

Filmography

Television

Films

References

External links
 TVB.com Leung Ka Ki - Official Website 
 Kaki Leung at Instagram
 Kaki Leung at Sina Weibo
 Kaki Leung Ka-Kei

1981 births
Living people